The Lost Tapes or Lost Tapes may refer to:

Music recordings
The Lost Tapes (Nas album), a 2002 compilation album
Lost (T)apes, a compilation album by Guano Apes released in 2006
The Lost Tapes – Rare Recordings 1991–2007, a 2007 compilation album by Ooberman
The Lost Tapes, a 2007 release by New Orleans' rapper Mac (McKinley Phipps)
The Lost Tapes (Can album), 2012
The Lost Tape (mixtape), a 2012 mixtape by 50 Cent
The Lost Tapes (Big Brother and the Holding Company album)
The Lost Tapes – Remixed, a 2015 album by Sam Smith
The Lost Tapes, by Ghostface Killah
The Lost Tapes (Sugababes album), 2022

Video recordings
The Lost Tapes (Dead Kennedys), 2003
The Lost Tapes aka The Lost West Side Story Tapes, a 2002 video release of the "West Side Story" set recorded for the 1985 Buddy Rich album Mr Drums:...

Other uses
Lost Tapes, an American television series that aired on Animal Planet
The Lost Tape (film), a 2012 Indian Hindi-language horror film
The Lost Tapes (TV series), an American documentary series that aired on the Smithsonian Channel

See also
The Lost Tapes of Cogumelo, a 1990 compilation album of various artists released by the Brazilian label Cogumelo Records
Lost Tapes of Opio, a 1996 release by Jon Anderson
Beginnings: The Lost Tapes 1988–1991, a 2007 (posthumously released) compilation album of material recorded by Tupac Shakur